Free Time is the second extended play (EP) by Australian singer-songwriter Ruel. The EP was announced in July 2019 and was released on 13 September 2019 through RCA Records. "Painkiller" was released as the lead single on 30 April 2019. His second EP, Bright Lights, Red Eyes was written in an AirBnB in Paris.

Reception

David from auspOp said the EP has "There is something both modern and instantly classic about all the songs included here and as people tend to listen to playlists more and more than albums or EPs, this one draws you in from start to finish" adding "The musical maturity is here and that comes through on the lyrics as much as the arrangements.".

Debbie Carr from ABC called the EP "sophisticated" saying "Ruel is riding a rollercoaster that's only going up."

Broadway World said "The new body of work is the next step in the evolution of Ruel as an artist, demonstrating his deep maturity as a writer, able to seamlessly move through genres and pen relatable lyrics."

Track listing 
Credits adapted from Tidal.

Notes
  signifies a co-producer.
  signifies an miscellaneous producer.
 "Don't Cry" features background vocals from Sarah Aarons.
 "Painkiller" features background vocals from Sarah Aarons.
 "Hard Sometimes" features background vocals from Wrabel.
 "Face to Face" features background vocals from Thief.
 "Unsaid" features background vocals from Siobhan O'Rourke, Thief and Tobias Jesso Jr.
 "Free Time" features background vocals from Camille Grigsby, Cassandra Grigsby-Chimm, Jason McGee and Quishima Dixon.

Charts

Weekly charts

Year-end charts

Certifications

Release history

References

2019 debut EPs
Ruel (singer) EPs